Oganes Danielian (3 January 1974 – 3 August 2016) was an Armenian chess player. He was awarded the title of Grandmaster by FIDE in 1999.

Achievements
 1992: Second in the World Youth Chess Championship Under 18 at Duisburg
 1992: Fourth in the World Junior Chess Championship at Buenos Aires
 1993: Second at Hallsberg Open
 1993: Won a match against GM Eloi Relange at Cannes with 3½-2½
 1994: Fourth at Cappelle-la-Grande Open
 1998: Won the Goldberg Memorial at Moscow, ahead of Evgeniy Najer and Mihail Saltaev
 2008: Third place with Andrey Vovk and Evgeni Vasiukov in the Transkarpathian Cup at Mukachevo

References

External links
 Oganes Danielian games at 365Chess.com
 

1974 births
2016 deaths
Armenian chess players
Chess grandmasters
Sportspeople from Yerevan